USS S-49 (SS-160) was a fourth-group (S-48) S-class submarine of the United States Navy.

Construction and commissioning

S-49'''s keel was laid down on 22 October 1920 by the Lake Torpedo Boat Company in Bridgeport, Connecticut. She was launched on 23 April 1921, sponsored by Mrs. Joseph E. Austin, and commissioned at Bridgeport on 6 June 1922 with Lieutenant Ingram C. Sowell in command.

Service historyS-49 remained at Bridgeport through July 1922, but in August 1922 she moved down to the Submarine Base at New London, Connecticut, where she joined Submarine Division Zero, composed of units engaged in submarine research and development. Later reassigned to Submarine Division 4 and then to Submarine Division 2, she continued experimental work, including aerial visibility tests and torpedo development, and also participated in regularly scheduled exercises, primarily in the New London area, into 1926. At the end of January 1926, she proceeded to Portsmouth Navy Yard at Kittery, Maine, for a regular overhaul.

On 2 April 1926, S-49 returned to New London, but on 20 April 1926 her operating schedule was again interrupted. At about 07:50 that morning, S-49’s engines were started. Seven minutes later, just as a pilot cell cover was removed to test the specific gravity of the electrolyte, the forward battery exploded. The hydrogen gas explosion destroyed the battery cells in the forward half of the battery and forced up the battery deck. Ten men were injured, two others were gassed during rescue operations, and four of the twelve died of their injuries. The battery compartment was sealed and kept shut until mid-afternoon on 20 April, when the outboard battery vent was opened. During the night, the submarine took on a slight list to port and S-49′s crew used air pressure to keep ballast. At about 05:15 on 21 April, a second explosion occurred in the battery room when wash from vessels departing for torpedo practice rocked S-49. The compartment was resealed for another few hours, after which the work of clearing the wreckage was begun.

Following repairs, S-49 resumed operations off the New England coast, and in January 1927 moved south with the submarine  for exercises and tests off Key West, Florida, the Dry Tortugas, and in Tampa Bay on the coast of Florida. On 12 March 1927 she returned to New London, from which she completed a run to Portsmouth, New Hampshire, and back before proceeding to Philadelphia, Pennsylvania, with S-50, for inactivation. Arriving on 31 March 1927, she was decommissioned on 2 Augus1927 t and berthed with other reserve ships at League Island in Philadelphia until struck from the Naval Vessel Register on 21 March 1931 in accordance with the London Naval Treaty. S-49 was sold to the Boston Iron and Metal Company of Baltimore, Maryland, on 25 May 1931.

Tourist attraction
In 1931, S-49 was purchased by "Captain" Francis J. Chrestensen and toured the United States East Coast for several years as a floating exhibit and tourist attraction, for which he charged a 25-cent admission. In 1936, she was an exhibit at the Great Lakes Exposition in Cleveland, Ohio.

In 1942, Chrestensen was the respondent in the United States Supreme Court case Valentine v. Chrestensen, in which he was accused of violating, in 1940, a New York City ordinance against distributing handbills for commercial purposes by handing out flyers advertising S-49.  The court ruled that distribution of handbills could only be for informational or protest purposes.  Chrestensen reissued a handbill which deleted the admission charge and had a protest on the back against the City Dock Department for refusing to grant him dockage.

Chrestensen also published a booklet describing the S-49 and promoting the capabilities of submarines.

Sinking
The U.S. Navy apparently reacquired S-49 about 1941 at Baltimore "as equipment" for use in experimental work at the Naval Mine Warfare Proving Ground, Solomons, Maryland. The wreck is visited, on occasion, by Navy and recreational divers.

 References 

Navsource.org - Features several photos of S-49''.

Ships built in Bridgeport, Connecticut
S-49
1921 ships
Maritime incidents in 1926
Maritime incidents in December 1942
Shipwrecks in rivers
Shipwrecks of the Maryland coast
United States submarine accidents